William John James (born 18 July 1956) is a former Welsh international rugby union player.

A hooker, he captained the Wales national rugby union team on one occasion against Ireland in 1987. James played his club rugby for Aberavon RFC where he was initially nurtured under the eye of club legend and then Captain Morton Howells, whom he succeeded in the front row berth.

James was one of three front row Internationals in the Aberavon RFC side at that time – Clive Williams and John Richardson being the others.

He captained Aberavon RFC in the 1979–80, 1980–1, 1984–5, 1987–88 & 1988–9 seasons.

In 1989 James was one of several leading players who fell out with the management of the club over several issues, the major one being finance and the way forward. No agreement was reached and he was one of nineteen players who left the club. He finished his career with Swansea RFC

Notes

Aberavon RFC players
Welsh rugby union players
Wales international rugby union players
Wales rugby union captains
Rugby union hookers
Living people
1956 births
Rugby union players from Port Talbot